4X is a subgenre of strategy video games.  The term is a loose acronym of "explore, expand, exploit, and exterminate", coined in 1993 to describe the gameplay of Master of Orion.  4X games usually feature complex simulations of scientific research, economics, diplomacy, and social dynamics.  Unlike computer wargames, they usually have more ways to win than through warfare, and they model the creation and evolution of an empire from its beginning.  Games prior to Master of Orion have been retroactively identified as 4X games.  Early precursors include the board games Outreach and Stellar Conquest, both published in the 1970s.  Some early strategy video games, such as Andromeda Conquest (1982) and Cosmic Balance II (1983) incorporated what would later become elements of 4X games, but the first 4X video game was Reach for the Stars (1983).  Because of the genre's focus on mouse-and-keyboard control schemes, most 4X games are available on personal computers, but examples exist on other platforms.  Some 4X games include elements of real-time strategy, but 4X games are typically slow-paced.



Video game platforms

List

Classic 4X games

Games with additional 4X mode 
These games include a mode of gameplay that resembles the 4X genre (i.e. global map instead campaign).

See also
 List of strategy video games

References

4X
4X